Sir James Boleyn (died 1561) was a courtier in the reign of Henry VIII of England and chancellor of the household of his niece, Anne Boleyn, the second wife of Henry VIII. He was thus the grand-uncle of Elizabeth I. James was the son of Sir William Boleyn and his wife, Lady Margaret Butler. His eldest brother was Thomas Boleyn, 1st Earl of Wiltshire.

Career
He was knighted in 1520 for reasons unknown. In 1529, he sat for Norfolk in the Reformation parliament. He was a Knight of the Body by 1533. This position did not involve regular attendance at court and was "largely honorific".

Marriage
James married Elizabeth Wood, who was one of the principal witnesses against their niece, Anne Boleyn, when she was arrested for adultery, incest and conspiring to kill the king. James is described as someone who shared Anne Boleyn's reformist beliefs.<ref>p. 265, Eric Ives, Anne Boleyn</ref> He and the king debated scripture with Hugh Latimer.

Sir James Boleyn died in 1561.

References

Sources
Retha M. Warnicke, 1989, The Rise and Fall of Anne Boleyn'', (Cambridge: Cambridge University Press, 1989), p. 157

English courtiers
James
Year of birth unknown
Knights Bachelor
Members of the Parliament of England for Norfolk
16th-century English people
Date of death unknown
1561 deaths
Household of Anne Boleyn